975 Perseverantia  is a minor planet orbiting the Sun that was discovered by Austrian astronomer Johann Palisa on 27 March 1922.

This is a member of the dynamic Koronis family of asteroids that most likely formed as the result of a collisional breakup of a parent body. The semi-major axis of the orbit of 975 Perseverantia lies just outside the 5/2 Kirkwood gap, located at 2.824 AU.

References

External links 
 
 

000975
Discoveries by Johann Palisa
Named minor planets
000975
19220327